Steve Kapuadi (born 30 April 1998) is a French professional footballer who plays as a centre-back for Wisła Płock.

Club career
Kapuadi moved to AS Trenčín from partner club of Inter Bratislava during the winter of 2020. He made his professional Fortuna Liga debut for Trenčín during a home fixture, at their temporary home ground at pod Dubňom, against Zemplín Michalovce on 15 February 2020. He played the entire 90 minutes of the match as a centre back, along with another winter arrival Richard Križan. Trenčín went on to defeat Zemplín with a 8:1 victory. Kapuadi also made three further appearances in the remaining games of the regular season, becoming a regular in the starting eleven.

On 2 June 2022, Kapuadi was announced as Polish Ekstraklasa side Wisła Płock's new signing, penning a one-and-a-half-year deal.

References

External links
 AS Trenčín official club profile 
 Futbalnet profile 
 
 

1998 births
Living people
French sportspeople of Democratic Republic of the Congo descent
French footballers
French expatriate footballers
Black French sportspeople
Association football defenders
K.A.A. Gent players
FK Inter Bratislava players
AS Trenčín players
Wisła Płock players
3. Liga (Slovakia) players
Slovak Super Liga players
Ekstraklasa players
French expatriate sportspeople in Belgium
Expatriate footballers in Belgium
French expatriate sportspeople in Slovakia
Expatriate footballers in Slovakia
French expatriate sportspeople in Poland
Expatriate footballers in Poland